Peninah Malonza, OGW (born March 7, 1974 in Kitui County) is a Kenyan politician and serves as the current Cabinet Secretary for Tourism, Wildlife and Heritage.

Early life and education 
Malonza was born in Kitui County on March 7, 1974.

She attended the University of Nairobi where she got her Bachelor of Arts degree in Anthropology and her Master’s degree in Project Planning and Management. Currently, she is pursuing a Master’s Degree in Public Health at the same university She undertook a course in Economic Recovery Models at Kyungwoon University, Saemaul Academy. Later she undertook a course in Community Leadership MAS level 2 at the Global University, USA. Malonza has a Diploma in Psychological counseling and is a Member of the Kenya Association of Professional Counsellors.

Career 
From 2002 to 2006 she was Project Director at Changamwe Baptist Church. She later served in various roles at Compassion International Kenya, rising to the level of Partner Training and Support as Senior Director from 2006 to 2013.

From 2013 to 2017 she served as Deputy governor of Kitui County under Governor Julius Malombe. Prior to joining politics she previously served as a Project Coordinator at AMREF- Kenya.

In 2022 she unsuccessfully contested for the women’s rep seat in Kitui County. She was nominated as the Cabinet Secretary Tourism, Wildlife, and Heritage by President Ruto. The national assembly committee on appointments initially rejected her nomination as Tourism Cabinet Secretary, citing that she did demonstrate knowledge of topical, administrative, and technical issues touching on the ministry but was later on approved as the Cabinet secretary for Tourism.

In addition to being one of the 10 women chosen by President William Ruto, Ms. Malonza is one of only two ministers from the Ukambani region and the first Cabinet secretary recruited from the Kitui South seat since independence.

.

Awards 
In 2015 she was awarded the Order of Grand Warrior (OGW) award by President Uhuru Kenyatta.

References 

1974 births
Living people
University of Nairobi alumni